Silver is the twelfth studio album released by Swiss hard rock band Gotthard. It was released on 13 January 2017 through G Records. The album was intended to celebrate the band's 25th anniversary, and its name is a reference to a silver wedding anniversary. The album produced one single, "Stay With Me", released on 18 November 2016.

Track listing

Personnel
Gotthard
 Nic Maeder – vocals
 Leo Leoni – guitars, production
 Freddy Scherer – guitars
 Marc Lynn – bass
 Hena Habegger – drums

Charts

References

2017 albums
Gotthard (band) albums
Albums produced by Charlie Bauerfeind